Pál Gerevich (born 10 August 1948) is a Hungarian fencer, who won two Olympic bronze medals in the team sabre competitions. Pál Gerevich won the world championships in sabre fencing in 1977 and is currently coaching the Viennese fencing club Wiener Sportclub.

He also was a member of the Hungarian team that won the world championships in 1973, 1978, 1981 and 1982, and won silver in 1975 and bronze in 1977. He was elected Hungarian Sportsman of the year in 1977.

He is the son of legendary fencer Aladár Gerevich and Olympic medalist Erna Bogen-Bogáti. His grandfather Albert Bogen who competed for Austria at the 1912 Summer Olympics (winning a silver medal in team sabre) and for Hungary at the 1928 Summer Olympics.

References

External links
 Pál Gerevich with cadet gold medalists of WSC

1948 births
Living people
Hungarian male sabre fencers
Fencers at the 1972 Summer Olympics
Fencers at the 1980 Summer Olympics
Olympic fencers of Hungary
Olympic bronze medalists for Hungary
Olympic medalists in fencing
Fencers from Budapest
Medalists at the 1972 Summer Olympics
Medalists at the 1980 Summer Olympics
Universiade medalists in fencing
Universiade silver medalists for Hungary
Medalists at the 1973 Summer Universiade
20th-century Hungarian people